The Suzuki Mehran is a rebadged version of the second-generation Suzuki Alto CA/CC71, manufactured by Pak Suzuki Motors. It was introduced as the successor to the classic Suzuki FX, a rebadged First Generation Suzuki Alto (SS80S). Upon its introduction to the Pakistani market in 1989, the Suzuki Mehran had a retail price of PKR.90,000. In November 2016, the Suzuki Mehran sold for around 650,000 Pakistani rupee ($3892).

History
In 2013, a Euro-II model was introduced, the only notable difference was the use of an electronic fuel injection system that replaced the already long-outdated carburettor that came installed in models up until 2012. The car was badged with a "euro-II" mark on the rear and sold at a higher price.

In 2015, press reports indicated the car sold for US$6,500-7700, despite lacking essential and basic safety features such as airbags, ABS, rear window defogger, side air conditioner vents, seat belt reminder and even rear seat belts. Front row seatbelts first came preinstalled during the mid-2000s. Besides the suspension system that was based on a low-cost, obsolete leaf spring rigid axle, the car had remained almost exactly the same over its 32-year production span, with absolutely no significant changes made to the interior or exterior, other than the gradual reduction in build quality over the years. The vehicle during the last two decades towards its end of production was reminiscent of a bygone era, having an outdated and obsolete look. Towards the end of production, local parts content had increased to 72 percent.

Maintenance on the Mehran was relatively cheaper, this is what allowed it to have a higher resale value than most other vehicles in the market. Despite being obsolete, the car still had a high demand. In September 2018, Pak Suzuki accounted for having sold 47,199 units in the country. As compared to other locally assembled cars. By February 2019, Pak Suzuki had taken up the prices to their highest extent, with the basic variant "VX" having a retail price of PKR.825,000 with a choice of three colors – White, Silky Silver, and the darker Graphite Grey.

Pak Suzuki finally ended production for the Mehran in March 2019, when it was discontinued in favor of the eighth generation Alto (HA36S) that was introduced later that year.

Technical specifications

Dimensions
 Body type: five-door hatchback
 Overall length: 
 Overall width: 
 Overall height: 
 Wheelbase: 
 Tread front: 
 Tread rear: 
 Minimum turning radius:

Engine
 Engine: 796 cc F8B (carburetor, later EFI)
 Type: EFI (Euro II technology with Alto 660cc engine introduced in April 2019)
 No. of cylinders: three cylinder 
 Top Speed: 140 km/h 
 EFI mileage 18 km/L (Euro II) on highway
 EFI mileage 12 km/L (Euro II) in city
 Piston displacement: 800 cc
 Bore × stroke: 68.5 mm × 72.0 mm
 Max. output (kW / rpm): 29.4/5,500
 Max. torque (Nm / rpm): 59.0/3,000

Chassis
 Steering: manual (no power assist)
 Suspension front: MacPherson strut. 
 Suspension rear: leaf springs
 Brakes: front and rear drums (no ABS nor a Brake Booster)

See also
 Pak Suzuki Motors
Maruti 800
 Transport in Pakistan

References

External links
 
 Pak Suzuki Cars

Cars of Pakistan
Mehran
Pakistani brands
Automotive industry in Pakistan

Cars introduced in 1988
1990s cars
2000s cars
2010s cars
Cars discontinued in 2019